Waterlows Football Club was a football club based in Dunstable, England.

History
Founded in 1913, Waterlows was formed as a works team for the employees of the printing company Waterlow and Sons. A few years after Waterlows' formation, also known as Waterlows Athletic, the club joined the Bedfordshire County League. They won the league in 1923 and twice more in 1925 and 1926, once it had changed names to the Bedfordshire & District County League. Waterlows entered the FA Cup for the first time for the 1926–27 season and progressed to the Northamptonshire League for three seasons, before returning to the South Midlands League.

In 1930 Waterlows won the South Midlands League once again before moving upwards to the stronger Spartan League and finished third in Division One in that first season. They won Division One in 1932/33 and were promoted to the Premier Division which they won in 1936 and 1938. During the Club's heyday in the 1920s and 1930s, Waterlows won the Bedfordshire Senior Cup ten times, but only once did they progress to the 1st Round Proper of the FA Amateur Cup, when in 1937/38 they were narrowly defeated 3-2 by Kingstonian of the Isthmian League.

In 1946, Waterlows rejoined the South Midlands League, winning promotion to the Premier Division in 1956. In 1971, Waterlows left the South Midlands League, rejoining in 1977, winning promotion back into the Premier Division at their first season back in the league. In 1985, Waterlows left the South Midlands League for the final time.

Ground
Waterlows played at French's Avenue in Dunstable.

Records
 Beds Senior Cup Winners - 1924, 1925, 1928, 1929, 1932, 1933, 1934, 1936, 1939 and 1940
 Beds County League Winners - 1923
 Beds & District County League Winners - 1925 and 1926
 South Midlands League Division One Winners - 1930 and 1961
 Spartan League Premier Division Winners - 1936 and 1938
 Spartan League Division One Winners - 1933
 Best FA Cup performance: Fourth qualifying round, 1926–27
 Best FA Amateur Cup performance: First Round Proper 1937-38
 Best FA Vase performance: First round, 1982–83

References

Wilson, Mike (2002) The Spartan Football League Volume 2 1930/31 to 1949/50.

Perkins, Bob (2007) South Midlands League Tables 1922-1997.

Northamptonshire League tables at Non-League Tables archive at https://www.nonleaguematters.co.uk/nlmnet/Regs_2_M/NorL95.html.

Defunct football clubs in England
Dunstable
Waterlow and Sons
Works association football teams in England
South Midlands League
Association football clubs established in 1922
1922 establishments in England
Association football clubs disestablished in 1985
1985 disestablishments in England
Defunct football clubs in Bedfordshire